Edward Hinton may refer to:
 Edward Hinton (priest), Irish Anglican priest
 Edward W. Hinton, professor of law
 Ed Hinton (sportswriter), motorsports columnist
 Ted Hinton (footballer), Northern Irish footballer

See also
 Ed Hinton (disambiguation)
 Eddie Hinton, American songwriter and session musician
 Eddie Hinton (American football), American football wide receiver
 Ted Hinton, Texas deputy sheriff